The Arboretum de la Tuillère is a private arboretum located in Ayen, Corrèze, Limousin, France. The arboretum was created in 1990 and now contains about 900 species of woody plants. It is open daily several days per year.

See also 
 List of botanical gardens in France

References 
 Carnet des Jardins en Limousin, page 3 (French)
 Les Jardins de France entry (French)

Gardens in Corrèze
Tuillere